Kothali, short for Kothalilitulanda, is a village in Chikkodi taluk Belgaum district of Karnataka, India.

References

Villages in Belagavi district